The Tenth East Asia Summit was held in Kuala Lumpur, Malaysia on November 21–22, 2015. The East Asia Summit is an annual meeting of national leaders from the East Asian region and adjoining countries.

Attending delegations
The heads of state and heads of government of the eighteen countries were participated in the summit.

Agenda
The agenda of EAS meeting was to establishment of an ASEAN Community and the signing of the U.S.-ASEAN strategic partnership. The meeting also saw the official extension of the plan of action (POA) to implement the Phnom Penh Declaration on the East Asia Summit Development Initiative until the end of 2017.

References

2015 conferences
2015 in international relations
21st-century diplomatic conferences (Asia-Pacific)
ASEAN meetings
2015 in Malaysia
2010s in Kuala Lumpur
November 2015 events in Asia